Azeca goodalli is a species of small air-breathing land snail, a terrestrial pulmonate gastropod mollusk in the family Cochlicopidae.

This is the only still existent species in the genus Azeca.

Distribution
This species is known to occur in a number of countries and islands in Western Europe to Central Europe, including:
 Great Britain
 Other areas

References

 Bank, R. A.; Neubert, E. (2017). Checklist of the land and freshwater Gastropoda of Europe. Last update: July 16th, 2017
 Kerney, M.P., Cameron, R.A.D. & Jungbluth, J-H. (1983). Die Landschnecken Nord- und Mitteleuropas. Ein Bestimmungsbuch für Biologen und Naturfreunde, 384 pp., 24 plates. [Summer or later]. Hamburg / Berlin (Paul Parey)

External links
 
 Manganelli, G., Barbato, D., Pieńkowska, J. R., Benocci, A.; Lesicki, A. & Giusti, F. (2019). Unravelling the tangle of the azecid land snails: a survey on the supraspecific systematics based on comparative morphology and molecular phylogeny (Gastropoda: Eupulmonata: Orthurethra). Folia Malacologica. 27(4): 253-291

Pupilloidea
Gastropods described in 1821